Three Men on a Horse is a 1936 comedy film directed and produced by Mervyn LeRoy, adapted from the Broadway play of the same name written by George Abbott and John Cecil Holm. A mild-mannered greeting card poet has the uncanny ability to pick winners in horse races.

Plot
Meek Erwin Trowbridge (Frank McHugh) finally has enough of his sneering brother-in-law, Clarence Dobbins (Paul Harvey), unappreciative boss, greeting card publisher J.G. Carver (Guy Kibbee), and the lack of support of his wife Audrey (Carol Hughes). Erwin goes on a drinking binge and ends up in a hotel bar.

When he overhears Charlie (Allen Jenkins), and Frankie (Teddy Hart) bemoaning their bad luck betting on horses, he gives them his pick for the next race. They ignore the drunk, but when Erwin proves right, their friend Patsy (Sam Levene) decides to place the little money they have left on Erwin's next choice. It wins, as do all his other selections that day, making the jubilant trio rich. They decide to hang onto their newfound goldmine.

Patsy tries to do Erwin a good turn by calling his boss and demanding a raise for him as his "manager", but the plan backfires; Carver fires Erwin. Erwin is upset, but Patsy gives him 10% of the winnings and convinces him that he can make more money betting than writing greeting card poems.

The next day, Erwin makes his picks, but discards his first choice for the sixth race. This arouses Charlie's suspicions. His fear about being double crossed infects the other two. Patsy forces Erwin to bet all his winnings on his second selection for that race. However, Erwin had told Patsy's girlfriend Mabel (Joan Blondell) that he never bet on the horses because he was worried that doing so would take away his ability.

The whole gang go to the racetrack to watch the race. Erwin's discarded choice wins, barely edging his second pick. When they get back to the hotel, Patsy starts beating Erwin. Then they hear on the radio that the winner has been disqualified. This inspires Erwin to punch Patsy back. When Clarence shows up, Erwin punches him too. Following close behind, Carver (desperate to fulfill a contract for Mother's Day cards) offers Erwin a raise and a new office, which Audrey persuades him to take. Erwin bids the gamblers goodbye, telling them that having finally bet for real, he has lost his knack.

Cast
Frank McHugh as Erwin Trowbridge
Joan Blondell as Mabel, Patsy's ditsy girlfriend
Guy Kibbee as J.G. Carver
Carol Hughes as Audrey Trowbridge
Allen Jenkins as Charlie
Sam Levene as Patsy. Levene performed same role in original 1935 Broadway production.
Teddy Hart as Frankie
Edgar Kennedy as Harry the bartender
Paul Harvey as Clarence Dobbins
Eddie Anderson as Moses the elevator operator
Virginia Sale as Chambermaid
Harry Davenport as Williams
Ottola Nesmith as Miss Hillary (as Tola Nesmith)
Eily Malyon as Miss Burns

External links
 
 
 

1936 films
1930s sports comedy films
American black-and-white films
American sports comedy films
American films based on plays
Films directed by Mervyn LeRoy
American horse racing films
Warner Bros. films
1936 comedy films
1930s English-language films
1930s American films